The 2019–20 Premier League of Bosnia and Herzegovina, known as Liga 12 and also known as BH Telecom Premier League for sponsorship reasons, was the twentieth season of the Premier League of Bosnia and Herzegovina, the highest football league of Bosnia and Herzegovina. The season began on 20 July 2019 and ended abruptly on 1 June 2020 due to the COVID-19 pandemic in Bosnia and Herzegovina, with a winter break between early December 2019 and late February 2020.

Teams
A total of 12 teams contested in the league, including 10 sides from the 2018–19 season and two promoted from each of the second-level leagues, Borac Banja Luka and Velež Mostar, replacing relegated sides Krupa and GOŠK Gabela.

Stadiums and locations

Personnel and kits

Note: Flags indicate national team as has been defined under FIFA eligibility rules. Players and Managers may hold more than one non-FIFA nationality.

League table

Positions by table

The table lists the positions of teams after each week of matches. In order to preserve chronological evolvements, any postponed matches are not included to the round at which they were originally scheduled, but added to the full round they were played immediately afterwards.

Results

Rounds 1–22

Top goalscorers

References

External links

2019–20
Bosnia and Herzegovina
1
Bosnia and Herzegovina